KSMQ-TV (channel 15) is a PBS member television station in Austin, Minnesota, United States. The station is locally owned by KSMQ Public Service Media, Inc. KSMQ-TV's studios are located on the campus of Riverland Community College on 8th Avenue Northwest (near I-90) in Austin, and its transmitter is located in rural east-central Mower County, northwest of Ostrander.

History
The station signed on the air in December 1971 as KAVT-TV, broadcasting on analog UHF channel 15 from a transmitter located near Austin. It was owned by the Austin school board. The station changed to the current KSMQ callsign in 1984. The school board sold the station to KSMQ Public Media, a community group, in 2004.

While much of the station's programming comes from PBS (it has been a member station since its inception), the station features additional programming supplied by numerous sources, including the National Educational Telecommunications Association (NETA) and American Public Television (APT). In the mid-2000s, the station signed on its digital signal on UHF channel 20 from the Ostrander tower shared by Fox affiliate KXLT-TV (channel 47).

KSMQ produces a wide variety of local content, including a weekly arts program, Off 90; On Q, a weekly public affairs program; and the agricultural education program Farm Connections. Additionally, since 2012 the station has produced documentaries focused on topics of regional concern, including immigration and school bullying. During election years, KSMQ produces and broadcasts panel discussions featuring every state legislative district in its viewing area. KSMQ is the recipient of five regional Emmy Awards for excellence in its locally produced programs. On May 2, 2015, KSMQ was presented with the Commanders' Award for Public Service by the U.S. Army. The Commanders' Medal, the fourth-highest Army decoration bestowed to civilians, was given to KSMQ Public Television for its continuing educational and marketing efforts in support of its 2013 World War II documentary The Typist.     
 
During the early morning of September 5, 2012, KSMQ's STL tower collapsed due to straight-line winds as severe thunderstorms moved through the Austin area, partially falling onto a building that housed the station's power equipment. There were no injuries. The station set up alternate transmitter facilities the following evening by installing a microwave dish atop its studios and manually redirecting it at its transmitter near Grand Meadow. While insurance covered the costs of constructing a new broadcast tower, the station subsequently set up a fund for the construction due to a minimum $7,000 deductible that the station owed. In December 2013, the station recouped a portion of its loss from an insurance settlement.

KSMQ has been digital-only since May 1, 2009.

Subchannels
The station's digital signal is multiplexed:

References

External links
Official website

SMQ-TV
PBS member stations
Television channels and stations established in 1971
1971 establishments in Minnesota